The Sims 2: Castaway is the third console spin-off of the life simulation video game The Sims 2 for the Wii, Nintendo DS (NDS), PlayStation 2 (PS2) and PlayStation Portable (PSP). It is also available on mobile phones; Nokia offered Castaway on the Ovi Store. A roughly similar game, The Sims Castaway Stories, is available for personal computers, but is not a direct port of Castaway. It is the final game released in the series for both the PS2 and PSP.

Story
The game begins on a boat after the player creates a crew of characters. The crew can consist of one to six Sims. After the crew's creation, a slide-show starts of some mobile phone pictures that are taken showing the trip and also showing the storm that wrecks the ship. The player's starting Sim wakes up on First Beach on Shipwreck Island. The Sim finds books detailing the goals the Sim must follow to survive on the islands and escape. Shortly after exploring Shipwreck Island, the Sim discovers a second island, Airplane Island, this one considerably larger and more interesting than the first, and builds a raft to reach the new location. After arriving on the island, the Sim is reunited with some of their lost crew. The player then has the option to form a tribe of Sims if the relationship is strong enough. While exploring Airplane Island, the player finds radio parts that are required to complete a goal later in the game. A third island, Volcano Island, can be reached once the player finds the second beach on Airplane Island and builds a canoe. On Volcano Island, the player will discover the remains of the llama people. The player has the option to return to civilization on this island. They can either build a boat or travel to the volcano's summit and use the radio parts to send an SOS signal to a nearby ship. The player can also repair a broken ceremonial forge on Volcano Island that will cause a fourth island, Crystal Island, to rise out of the sea, however this is optional and is not required for the player to escape the island. The game contains many discoverable secrets, including secret areas such as Hidden Lagoon and the Secret Pirate's Cove. These areas can only be accessed once the player has gathered objects such as hieroglyphics and treasure map pieces, however this is a relatively extensive process.

Differences from other Sims games
Unlike most Sims games outside the SimCity branch, the characters do not progress in age in The Sims 2: Castaway. Their hair grows longer and can be cut, but the Sims themselves don't get older. Another significant difference is some of the usually stock features like marriage have been either removed or adjusted for the alternative gameplay style; for example, players have to perform a specific sequence of actions in order for their Sims to get engaged. While this is true in ordinary Sims titles, other titles are more open in their methods of reaching engagement, whereas the process in Castaway is somewhat fixed. Like in The Urbz and later Sims console titles, Sims cannot have children. Additionally, the Nintendo Wii, Nintendo DS and PlayStation 2 versions of the game do not feature WooHoo (euphemistic slang for sexual activities in the series). For unknown reasons, the PlayStation Portable is the only version of the game to feature WooHoo, but only after marriage and specific requirements are met. Additionally, a staple feature in the console games, two player, was not present in this game.

Among other differences are:
Players have to construct a shelter (and a substantial amount of any of the other objects) from scratch and have their Sim physically build it.
Players have to craft their own clothing as – apart from accessories and underwear – their arrival on the island damages their normal clothes. However, it is possible to repair their original outfit once a sewing kit is crafted, albeit in an incomplete state.
Players can also carry items such as beds and work-benches with them to other areas, and these items can be obtained by collecting resources instead of buying them with money like in ordinary Sims titles, or by finding lost shipments of items that occasionally wash up on the shore.
The game is semi "open-world". Unlike other console Sims titles where the player must call a taxi, drive their car, or take the subway, Castaway allows the player to walk to other locations on the islands through "portals". Some of these portals require the player to meet certain skill requirements, motive requirements, or sometimes make them build something such as a bridge or raft. Unlike other console Sims titles (with the exception of the later-released The Sims 3 console port and its stand-alone expansion, The Sims 3 Pets), Castaway evolves "in the background". NPC Sims can die, grow their hair longer, get their clothes ruined and gain skills while the player Sim is somewhere else. Additionally, Sims can travel on their own free will to other sections of the island, or even to another island entirely.

Reception

The game received "mixed or average reviews" on all platforms according to the review aggregation website Metacritic. IGN said of the PlayStation 2 and Wii versions, "Designed for everyone's inner Gilligan, The Sims 2: Castaway is an amusing, if somewhat flawed exploration of island life. While it gives an interesting twist on the standard shipwreck concept, the hampered nature of the guidebooks, strange placement of plans in menus and continual micromanagement does hamper some of the fun of the title. However, Sims fans will find this to be a good break from the traditional Sims formula, and one that will keep them entertained for a while." In Japan, where the DS version was ported for release under the name  on January 24, 2008, Famitsu gave it a score of all four sevens for a total of 28 out of 40.

References

External links
 
 

2007 video games
BlackBerry games
Castaways in fiction
Electronic Arts games
Life simulation games
Mobile games
Nintendo DS games
PlayStation 2 games
PlayStation Portable games
The Sims
Social simulation video games
Survival video games
Video games featuring protagonists of selectable gender
Video games set on fictional islands
Video games set on islands
Wii games
Windows Mobile games
Full Fat games
Single-player video games
Video games developed in the United States